Malotenkashevo (Bäläkäy Teñkäş) is a rural locality (a village) in Baygildinsky Selsoviet, Nurimanovsky District, Bashkortostan, Russia. The population was 172 as of 2010. There are 3 streets.

Geography 
Malotenkashevo is located 29 km southwest of Krasnaya Gorka (the district's administrative centre) by road. Bolshetenkashevo is the nearest rural locality.

References 

Rural localities in Nurimanovsky District